Ann Hardaway Sutton (born October 23, 1958) is an American equestrian. She competed in two events at the 1988 Summer Olympics.

References

External links
 

1958 births
Living people
American female equestrians
Olympic equestrians of the United States
Equestrians at the 1988 Summer Olympics
Sportspeople from Columbus, Georgia
21st-century American women